Hugo Inocencio Caballero Fleytas (born 4 July 1958, in Emboscada, Paraguay) is a former centre back.

External links
 

1958 births
Living people
Paraguayan footballers
Cerro Porteño players
Club Nacional footballers
Paraguayan Primera División players
1983 Copa América players
Association football defenders
Paraguay international footballers
Club Nacional managers